Mate Baturina (born 1 August 1973) is a Croatian retired footballer who played as an attacking midfielder.

International career
He made his debut for Croatia in a June 1999 Korea Cup match against Egypt, coming on as a late substitute for Davor Vugrinec. It remained his sole international appearance.

References

External links

Mate Baturina at the Croatian Football Federation website

1973 births
Living people
Footballers from Split, Croatia
Association football midfielders
Croatian footballers
Croatia under-21 international footballers
Croatia international footballers
NK Solin players
HNK Šibenik players
NK Zagreb players
HNK Hajduk Split players
Grasshopper Club Zürich players
Bnei Yehuda Tel Aviv F.C. players
NK Zadar players
Croatian Football League players
Swiss Super League players
Israeli Premier League players
First Football League (Croatia) players
Croatian expatriate footballers
Expatriate footballers in Switzerland
Croatian expatriate sportspeople in Switzerland
Expatriate footballers in Israel
Croatian expatriate sportspeople in Israel